Laughing Anne is a 1953 British adventure film directed by Herbert Wilcox and starring Wendell Corey, Margaret Lockwood, Forrest Tucker, and Ronald Shiner. It was adapted from Joseph Conrad's short story, "Because of the Dollars" and from his 1923 two-act play, Laughing Anne. The film was shot at Shepperton Studios outside London. The film's sets were designed by the art director William C. Andrews and costumes were by Elizabeth Haffenden.

Production
In 1952 Herbert Wilcox announced he had signed a co-production deal with Herbert Yates of Republic Pictures to make films together starring Anna Neagle and John Wayne, to be shot in colour and aimed at international markets. The projects would include an adaptation of Daphne du Maurier's The King's General and Joseph Conrad's Laughing Anne.

Laughing Anne would instead be made with Margaret Lockwood, who had signed a long-term contract with Wilcox, and two Hollywood names: Forrest Tucker and Wendell Corey. (Tucker had been under contract to Republic for six years.) As extra box office insurance, Ronald Shiner
was cast in a leading role. Lockwood's performance was done in the style of Marlene Dietrich.

Lockwood called it "the story of a gay woman who had a very unhappy marriage and love affair, and ends up looking aged and worn. I shudder to remember just what a lifelike job the make-up men did on me for my "aged and worn" scenes."

Plot
In a cafe a Polish seaman, Joseph Conrad, tells a story... In the 1880s a ship's captain called Davidson is left by his wife. He gets drunk and visits Farrell's Bar, where the star attraction is the singer, Laughing Anne. Anne is in an abusive relationship with a man called Jem Farrell.

Anne stows away on Davidson's boat, saying she is leaving Farrell. Anne and Davidson fall for each other. She reveals her past.

She was a popular singer in Paris in love with boxer Farrell, who is about to challenge for the world title.  Farrell refuses to throw the fight, and gangsters mutilate his hands, ending his boxing career.

Davidson proposes to Anne, and they sleep together, but she feels she cannot leave Farrell and returns to him.

Six years ago, Davidson finds Anne again – and her son by Farrell, Davey. Anne discovers a plan by Farrell to steal Davidson's cargo.  She warns Davidson, but is killed. Davidson kills Farrell and then raises Davey.

Cast
 Wendell Corey as Captain Davidson
 Margaret Lockwood as Laughing Anne
 Forrest Tucker as Jem Farell
 Ronald Shiner as Nobby Clarke
 Robert Harris as Joseph Conrad
 Jacques B. Brunius as Frenchie
 Daphne Anderson as Blonde singer
 Helen Shingler as  Susan Davidson
 Danny Green as Nicholas
 Harold Lang as Jacques
 Edgar Norfolk as Conrad's companion
 Sean Lynch as David
 Gerard Nolan as Davy
 Joe Powell as Pierre
Andy Ho as Chinese merchant
 Maurice Bush as Battling Brunius
 Bernard Rebel as Pianist
 Julian Sherrier as	Bartender

Release
The film had to be cut for release in the US, including removal of the word "damn" and a scene where Lockwood swam nude.

Reception
The film was not well received, critically or commercially. It contributed to the decline in Lockwood's career.

Critical reception
The New York Times wrote:

"Always a man for pictorial respectability, Mr. Wilcox does quite nicely by an unelaborate budget, letting the Technicolor camera play over turn-of-the-century, gaslit rooms, shipboard and island exteriors and interiors. Several shots of a schooner braving awesome jungle waters are excellent. Furthermore, the film is based on a work by that master yarn-spinner and psychological prober, Joseph Conrad. The trimmings remain. But Mr. Wilcox's casual direction and a lusterless adaptation by Pamela Bower compress the story into a plodding reprise of thwarted love, sacrifice and skulduggery...  In the most colorless casting, Mr. Corey is quietly effective, Miss Lockwood ranges from skittish to grim, and Mr. Forrest glares or snarls. As a sailor, Ronald Shiner takes care of the humor department. And in the role of Mr. Conrad, no less, a bearded, scholarly-looking actor named Robert Harris hears the story from Mr. Forrest in flashback on the sidelines. This much, undoubtedly, is as it should be."

References

External links

Laughing Anne at TCMDB
Laughing Anne at BFI
Laughing Anne at Letterbox DVD
Review of film at Variety
text of Because of the Dollars

1953 films
British historical films
British adventure films
1953 adventure films
1950s historical films
Films based on works by Joseph Conrad
Films directed by Herbert Wilcox
Films set in Indonesia
Films set in the 1890s
Films set in the 1900s
Republic Pictures films
Films shot at Shepperton Studios
Seafaring films
1950s English-language films
1950s British films